Shane Frederick is a tenured professor at the Yale School of Management. He earlier worked at Massachusetts Institute of Technology. He is the creator of the cognitive reflection test, which has been found to be "predictive of the types of choices that feature prominently in tests of decision-making theories, like expected utility theory and prospect theory. People who score high on the CRT are less vulnerable to various biases,  and show more patience in intertemporal choice tasks. 

His specialties are decision-making and intertemporal choice, time preferences and discount functions, and has authored papers with, among others, George Loewenstein of Carnegie Mellon University and Nobel laureate Daniel Kahneman, emeritus of Princeton University.

Frederick was born in Park Falls, Wisconsin, and graduated from the University of Wisconsin with a B.A. in Zoology, from Simon Fraser University with an M.S. in Resource Management, and from Carnegie Mellon University with a Ph.D. in Decision Sciences.

Selected publications
Representativeness revisited: Attribute substitution in intuitive judgment (with D. Kahneman)
Time discounting and time preference: a critical review (with T. O'Donoghue)

References

External links
Would You Take the Bird in the Hand, or a 75% Chance at Two in the Bush?, New York Times, Jan. 26, 2006
Holiday Discounts May Not Be Enough, Boston Globe, Dec. 11, 2007
Shane Frederick's Google Scholar Page

Living people
1968 births
 University of Wisconsin–Madison College of Letters and Science alumni
People from Park Falls, Wisconsin
MIT Sloan School of Management faculty
Yale School of Management faculty
Carnegie Mellon University alumni
Simon Fraser University alumni
American cognitive scientists